Rukuhia railway station was a flag station on the North Island Main Trunk in New Zealand, located in the settlement of Rukuhia. It was established during an extension of the railway line in the 1870s. The service started with two trains a day.

Opening of the line from Hamilton to Ōhaupō was delayed by subsidence at Rukuhia. A service had been planned from 25 February 1878 and the Governor General went over the line on 27 March 1878, but opening was still postponed as large quantities of gravel were poured into a hole. The line finally opened on 4 June 1878. A 1943 notice noted that owing to the danger of track subsidence, no engine must be allowed to remain stationary on the siding for any length of time. Tests in 1981 found that the track deformed by about 12mm each time a train went over it, due to the peat swamp.

A passing loop for 38 wagons was added in 1908 and sheep yards by 1911.

On 12 September 1971 Rukuhia closed to all traffic and only a passing loop remains.

References

External links 

 1951 photo of station

Defunct railway stations in New Zealand
Rail transport in Waikato
Buildings and structures in Waikato